Merigomish Harbour 31 is a Mi'kmaq reserve located in Pictou County, Nova Scotia.

It is administratively part of the Pictou Landing First Nation.

Indian reserves in Nova Scotia
Communities in Pictou County
Mi'kmaq in Canada